K35OY-D (channel 35) is a television station licensed to Columbia, Missouri, United States, serving the Columbia–Jefferson City market as an affiliate of Circle. It is owned by HC2 Holdings. K35OY-D's transmitter is located on East Biggs Road northwest of Ashland, Missouri.

History 
The station was given a license to cover by the FCC on February 25, 2022.

On December 31 of 2022, Azteca America cease operations.

Technical information

Subchannels 
The station's signal is multiplexed:

References

Television stations in Columbia, Missouri